Damir Džumhur (born 20 May 1992) is a professional tennis player from Bosnia and Herzegovina. He is currently Bosnia and Herzegovina's No. 1 player. His career-best singles ranking of World No. 23 achieved on 2 July 2018, makes him the highest-ranked player ever competing for Bosnia and Herzegovina.

By winning the 2017 St. Petersburg Open singles tournament, Džumhur became the first player competing under the Bosnian flag to claim an ATP World Tour title. He added also a triumph at the 2017 Kremlin Cup and became the first player in tennis history to win both events played on Russian soil in the same season. Džumhur is also the first male player to represent Bosnia and Herzegovina in the main draw of any Grand Slam tournament. 

He is a member of the Bosnia and Herzegovina Davis Cup team, and he competed at the 2016 Summer Olympics, being selected as the first male tennis player from his country to do so.

As a junior, he was ranked world No. 3 and he was a bronze medalist at the 2010 Youth Olympic Games.

Early and personal life
Džumhur was born on 20 May 1992 in Sarajevo as a first child to father Nerfid Džumhur and mother Žaneta. His birth came shortly after the outbreak of the Bosnian War in a maternity hospital located near the Zetra Olympic Hall. The arena was destroyed at the time, but it was the same place where Damir would start practicing tennis.

As a child, Džumhur practiced skiing and football in addition to tennis. Growing up, he admired Patrick Rafter and Roger Federer, and he is also a keen football fan and supports the Bosnian team FK Željezničar. 

As a teenager, Damir acted in movies. When he was 14, he was a background actor in the movie Grbavica by Jasmila Žbanić. This movie won the Golden Bear in Berlin in 2006. Damir also got his first significant role in the German movie Mörderischer Frieden (2007) by Rudolf Schweiger, where he played the role of the sharpshooter Duncan.

In addition to his native Bosnian, he speaks English. He studied political science at the Faculty of Political Science in Sarajevo at the University of Sarajevo.

Džumhur is currently in a relationship with Croatian model and former Big Brother contestant Barbara Šegetin, with whom he has a son named Luka.

Junior career

From the beginning, Džumhur has been coached by his father Nerfid, who has been running a tennis school since 1994. He started playing tennis at the age of five and began practising professionally in 1999 after the renovated Zetra has been opened.

In his early years, he participated in local events, mainly in Bosnia and Herzegovina, Croatia and Serbia and Montenegro. His first major success came in 2004 when he won the unofficial U–12 European Championships in Rome. That year, he played a total of nine tournaments, winning all of them and losing only four sets in the process.

Before turning 18, Džumhur was competing in various tournaments held across the continent and organized by Tennis Europe. He finished 2005 and 2006 seasons on 87th and 25th positions, respectively in Europe's under-14 boys' singles rankings, and in the years 2007 and 2008, he ended as the 13th- and 17th-ranked player in the under-16 category.

In 2008, Džumhur started competing in official ITF junior tournaments in the under–18 category. In that year, he played six tournaments in total, winning one and reaching the final of another. He closed his first season on this level with 17 wins and 5 losses, which classified him as the world's 299th junior player. The following season Damir participated in 20 such events, winning two titles, and with 45–17 win–loss record, he finished as 35th player. However he has not been ranked by ITF in those two years due to insufficient appearances in premier events.

In 2010, Džumhur played in 12 tournaments, four of which he claimed. That includes the triumph in the U–18 European Championships in Klosters, after beating Andrés Artuñedo Martínavarr in straight sets in the final. In August 2010, by defeating Victor Baluda Džumhur won the bronze medal in singles event at the 2010 Summer Youth Olympics in Singapore, where he was also a country representative during the Opening Ceremony as a flag bearer for Bosnia and Herzegovina. That year he appeared in his only three junior Grand Slam events, where he achieved a Second Round finish at the Roland Garros, a Quarterfinal finish at the Wimbledon Championships and a Third Round finish at the US Open in singles competitions and also a Quarterfinal, Second Round and Quarterfinal finish in doubles, respectively. In July 2010 Džumhur was placed third on the ITF world rankings, he finished this year on 4th place with 40 singles wins and 8 losses.

In 2010, he played his first two matches in Davis Cup for Bosnia and Herzegovina, winning both of them in matches against Estonia and Portugal.

Junior Grand Slam results - Singles:

Australian Open: - (-)
French Open: 2R (2010)
Wimbledon: QF (2010)
US Open: 3R (2010)

Junior Grand Slam results - Doubles:

Australian Open: - (-)
French Open: QF (2010)
Wimbledon: 2R (2010)
US Open: QF (2010)

ITF Junior finals

Singles: 9 (7 titles, 2 runner-ups)

Doubles: 9 (5 titles, 4 runner-ups)

Other finals

Singles: 7 (3 titles, 4 runner-ups)
Tournaments organized by Tennis Europe in the category "14 & Under"

Tournaments organized by Tennis Europe in the category "16 & Under"

Professional career

2011–2013: First years as a pro
Džumhur turned professional in 2011, making his debut at the ATP World Tour in Zagreb during qualifying for the 2011 PBZ Zagreb Indoors. He spent his first years as a pro mainly on the ATP Challenger Tour and in ITF Men's Circuit tournaments. He won an overall twelve singles and eight doubles Futures titles, as well as twice reached the finals in Challenger events – the 2013 Košice Open and 2013 Poznań Open, losing in three sets on both occasions to Mikhail Kukushkin and Andreas Haider-Maurer, respectively.

In that period Džumhur took part in four Davis Cup ties involving Bosnia and Herzegovina, playing in total of eight rubbers, winning in two singles and one doubles matches. He barely missed on a wild card into the 2012 Summer Olympics, as the last spot in the men's singles draw went to Lleyton Hewitt, which was criticized by Bosnian media.

He ended his first fully professional season on 339th position, while the next year he finished inside the Top 250. 

The year of 2013 saw Džumhur climbing into the top 200 in the world singles rankings, firstly achieved on 19 August 2013, and eventually he finished the year at World No. 187.

2014: Closing in on Top 100
In January 2014, Džumhur became the first male Bosnian representative to play in the main draw of a Grand Slam tournament, having reached the Third Round of the 2014 Australian Open, where he eventually lost to 7th seed Tomáš Berdych. On the way to this stage, Džumhur defeated Dustin Brown, Niels Desein, Ruben Bemelmans in qualifying competition, before winning against Jan Hájek, and 32nd seeded Ivan Dodig. He received praise from Berdych and Novak Djokovic after the tournament.

Džumhur then played for his country in Davis Cup First Round match against Greece, where he lost in four sets to Markos Kalovelonis, ranked 691st that time. However, in his next match he came back from two sets down and won against Alexandros Jakupovic, sealing a 3–1 victory for Bosnia and Herzegovina over Greece. That was then followed by a series of unsuccessful appearances in a combination of World Tour and Challenger Tour events across Europe and the United States, where Džumhur made his debut in ATP World Tour Masters 1000 cycle, having played in the qualifying of the Indian Wells Masters and the Miami Masters, where he won his sole eight points during that period. He finished his first hard-court part of the season by helping his country beat Finland in the 2014 Davis Cup Group II Second Round.

Džumhur opened his clay campaign by winning 2014 Mersin Cup – first Challenger tournament in his career. On the way to this triumph he defeated Guillaume Rufin, Egor Gerasimov, Thomas Fabbiano and Matteo Viola in straight sets. That was followed by a  win over Pere Riba in the final match, which allowed him to achieve career-high singles ranking. Džumhur became only the second player (after Amer Delić), who has ever won a Challenger tournament under the Bosnian flag. In May that year, at 2014 Roland Garros, he qualified for second straight Grand Slam tournament, where he lost in the first round to 26th seed Feliciano López. Straight after he went on to win his second challenger title, at 2014 BRD Arad Challenger, in Romania, by beating Pere Riba again in the final which moved him in Top 110 of ATP ranking.

Later in June, Džumhur took part in his only matches of the season played on grass surface, losing both of them in three sets – to Ante Pavić in singles and Gero Kretschmer/Alexander Satschko pair in doubles, during 2014 Wimbledon Championships qualifying events.

During his clay-court comeback, Džumhur won in Italy his third title of the season at 2014 San Benedetto Tennis Cup, by beating Andreas Haider-Maurer in the final in straight sets. That gave him first ever direct entry into the main draw of Grand Slam tournament – 2014 US Open. He was there defeated in the first round by David Ferrer, ranked No. 5 at that time, losing in four sets. A week before the start of US Open Džumhur qualified for the first time in his career to ATP World Tour event, which was 2014 Winston-Salem Open, played on hard surface, where he lost in two sets to Adrian Mannarino.

His last Davis Cup appearance of the season has ended in three-set defeat to Ričardas Berankis, which sealed victory for Lithuania and left Bosnia and Herzegovina in Group II of the Europe/Africa Zone.

In Autumn of 2014 Džumhur was unsuccessful in his hard-court appearances, however he twice achieved his career-high ranking of 101. On both occasions he was one point short of being placed among Top 100 of the world, as the first male Bosnian representative. He eventually finished that season on 109th place, and thus failed to achieve his goal, set in August, of singles ranking inside first hundred by the end of the season, as well as did not gain direct entry into the first Grand Slam tournament of the new season – 2015 Australian Open, but he fulfilled his initial wish of being ranked in Top 150 at the end of the year.

2015: Breakthrough in the ATP
Džumhur began the new season in India, where he was unsuccessful in his bid to qualify for the main draw of the 2015 Aircel Chennai Open, losing to Luca Vanni in the final qualifying round. For the first time in his career, he also took part in the main doubles draw of an ATP World Tour level tournament, playing alongside Aljaž Bedene. Later in January he failed to pass Australian Open qualifying, after a three set loss to Tim Pütz in the second qualifying round, while being the top seed in the draw. After the Australian Open, Džumhur managed to win his first career singles match on ATP World Tour level in 2015 PBZ Zagreb Indoors, against Michael Berrer, in three sets, after saving two match points, before falling to third seed Guillermo García-López in two sets. It was also the first ATP 250 series tournament in Džumhur's career, where he was a direct acceptance, thus did not have to play qualifying event in order to be in the main draw.

Right after the Croatian event, Džumhur went to Dominican Republic, where he dominated the first edition of 2015 Milex Open, played on green clay in Santo Domingo, and became the first player who has ever won a professional tennis tournament in that country. Džumhur did not lose a set on his way to the title and spent on court less than five and a half hours in total during whole tournament week. He won the final against Renzo Olivo by retirement. It followed wins over Benjamin Balleret, Bastian Trinker, Nicolas Jarry and Christian Garin. Džumhur was then accepted to the main draw of 2015 Morelos Open, as a special exempt, where he managed to win further four matches, bringing his tally to nine wins in a row, and thus reaching the second consecutive final on Challenger level, and his career-first played on hard surface. He lost to Víctor Estrella Burgos, but his semifinal win against Adrián Menéndez-Maceiras, where he saved two match points, gave him first ever placement inside the top 100 in ATP rankings, which made Džumhur the first male representative of Bosnia and Herzegovina to do so, and also the highest ranked player in a singles ranking list competing under the Bosnian flag (surpassing Mervana Jugic-Salkić's No. 99 ranking from June 2004).

In March, he played in his debut ATP Masters 1000 tournament, at 2015 Miami Open, where he lost in three sets to James Duckworth, after successfully passed qualifying. With this event, Džumhur has completed his first hard-court part of the season.

The beginning of April saw Džumhur win three consecutive ATP World Tour 250 matches against Paul-Henri Mathieu, Marcel Granollers and Andreas Haider-Maurer at 2015 Grand Prix Hassan II in Casablanca, which gave him his first ever semifinal appearance on this level, and his ranking subsequently increased to 85th. He became the first Bosnian player, who has reached last four stage in the World Tour event, before losing in three sets to second-seed Martin Kližan.

In May, Džumhur improved his career-best singles and doubles rankings, by reaching 81st and 342nd positions, respectively. Later that month he made headlines again after reaching third round at the French Open, where he lost to world No. 2 Roger Federer. After the match, Džumhur received approval from the Swiss, as well as described his pre-match feeling on facing his childhood idol as "dreaming". In the earlier stages of the tournament, Džumhur defeated Mikhail Youzhny, after the Russian retired while trailing by two sets, and Marcos Baghdatis in four sets.

Džumhur held grass-court preparations in Liverpool, where he was invited to play in an exhibition Liverpool Hope University International Tennis Tournament. After playing a total of four singles matches, he was named as a joint runner-up, together with Pablo Andújar. Džumhur was drawn against Federer in his first ever main draw appearance at Wimbledon, and he lost to the eventual runner-up in straight sets. For the first time in his career, Džumhur competed in doubles main draw at Grand Slam event – playing alongside Aljaž Bedene, they were defeated by the Steve Johnson/Sam Querrey team, also in straight sets.

During his summer clay-court comeback, Džumhur advanced to his first doubles challenger final, at 2015 Sparkassen Open, playing together with Franko Škugor, which placed him on his highest ever doubles ranking position. A couple of unsuccessful singles appearances on challenger level caused Damir to drop to 100th place on the ATP singles list, which however was enough to gain direct entry to the US Open. First round loss there in four sets against 24th seed Bernard Tomic has followed three consecutive defeats on ATP World Tour for Džumhur.

After 50 days without a win, Džumhur managed to win five consecutive matches in five days in Alphen aan den Rijn, losing two set in the process and sealed his fifth challenger title, defeating home player Igor Sijsling in three sets. He later went to Morocco to play three clay challengers in Kenitra, Mohammedia and Casablanca, winning the last one (defeated Daniel Muñoz de la Nava in three-set final), which gave him highest ever ranking position of 77.

He eventually finished 2015 season on 82nd place, after a series of failed attempts in clay court South American challengers during the months of October and November. Similarly like year before, Džumhur had not achieved his higher goal of placement among top 70 players of the world, but managed to fulfil the initial one, which was the year-end ranking position inside top 100, allowing him to be directly accepted into the 2016 Australian Open.

2016: Maiden Top 10 wins

Džumhur started the new season in Doha at the 2016 Qatar ExxonMobil Open. He defeated Marco Cecchinato before losing to Tomáš Berdych in straight sets. He later moved to Australia, where was defeated in 2016 Apia International Sydney qualifying by Maximilian Marterer, and then was drawn to face Kyle Edmund in the first round of the Australian Open. He came from behind to defeat him in five sets and then faced 15th seed David Goffin, losing in four sets.

He later took part in series of two indoor and then two outdoor hard court events across Europe and North America, losing in second rounds in Sofia, Memphis and Delray Beach before being defeated to Dominic Thiem in the first round of 2016 Abierto Mexicano Telcel in Acapulco, first ATP World Tour 500 series tournament in which Džumhur has ever participated in the main draw.

Džumhur began the month of March in Indian Wells, being crushed by Marcel Granollers in the first round, losing twelve consecutive games. After a second round exit in Guadalajara challenger he returned to the United States to play another Masters 1000 event of the season – 2016 Miami Open. In the opening round Džumhur defeated Leonardo Mayer, which was his only third win over a top 50 player (and first, not counting matches ended with opponent's retirement) and first singles triumph on this level. In his second match in Key Biscayne he faced former world No. 1 Rafael Nadal, ranked 5th at the time, who retired when Džumhur was serving while leading in set three. It was Džumhur's first Top 10 win in his career. He then defeated Mikhail Kukushkin in the third round, before losing to Milos Raonic in the Round of 16, finishing the first part of the season on 87th place.

His clay court part of the season started in Roquebrune-Cap-Martin, where Džumhur played in 2016 Monte-Carlo Rolex Masters. After passing the qualifying competition he beat Robin Haase and world No. 7 Tomáš Berdych, achieving his second win versus Top 10 ranked opponent and improving head-to-head record with the Czech to 1–2. He was then defeated by Milos Raonic, being two points away from placement in the quarterfinals. He then took part in two consecutive ATP World Tour 250 series tournaments in Bucharest and Istanbul, losing to Marco Cecchinato in the second round, and to Diego Schwartzman in the quarterfinals, respectively, despite having a match point in the match with the Argentine. Later he qualified for yet another Masters 1000 event that season, losing in the first round of 2016 Internazionali BNL d'Italia to Jérémy Chardy in three sets, while in the meantime he managed to improve his career-best ranking to 71.

In Roland Garros he was eliminated in the first round, being defeated in four sets by João Sousa. His fourth successive loss came in the opening round of a challenger circuit event – 2016 UniCredit Czech Open where he retired due to right ankle injury. It was the last tournament he played before the grass season.

On 9 June Džumhur received a Tripartite Commission Invitation, which gave him the right to represent Bosnia and Herzegovina at the 2016 Summer Olympics, as the first male tennis player in country's history. On July 19, 2016, Džumhur was confirmed as a direct entrant to the men's singles, due to the withdrawal of several tennis players from the Games. Hence, his invitation was transferred to fellow Bosnian tennis player – Mirza Bašić.

For the second year running Džumhur took part in the exhibition grass tournament played in June in Liverpool, and after winning both of his singles matches, including Sunday final against Paolo Lorenzi, he was crowned champion. Džumhur then continued his 2016 Wimbledon Championships preparations at 2016 Aegon Open Nottingham, beating in three sets a title-holder Denis Istomin, with the match being suspended after set two due to darkness, and then losing on the same day to Vasek Pospisil. The triumph against the Uzbekistani was his first recorded professional grass-court win. Džumhur then competed at the third major of the year in London. He won his first round match by defeating Denis Kudla in five sets before losing to Pierre-Hugues Herbert in round two.

In July Džumhur won both singles rubbers he played for Bosnia and Herzegovina in 3–1 victory against Turkey, sealing his country progress to the promotional play-offs. Then he played in Umag his last clay court ATP World Tour event of the season, defeating Nicolás Almagro and Thomas Fabbiano before losing a three-set quarterfinal battle with Fabio Fognini.

Džumhur's maiden participation at the Summer Olympics ended at the first hurdle as he was defeated by Dudi Sela in two sets. The match was overshadowed by an incident with Israeli spectators abusing Islam religion and Bosnian nation, particularly Džumhur, accusing him of being Muslim, which he denied. It caused a match suspension as the chair umpire Gianluca Moscarella had to intervene on the stands separating Džumhur's coach & father Nerfid from Sela's fans. His poor form continued in the United States, where Džumhur lost in the first matches in both of the tournaments he entered as a build-up to the 2016 US Open, namely in Western & Southern Open and Winston-Salem Open. After four consecutive losses Džumhur upset a 17th seed Bernard Tomic in the first round of the ultimate Grand Slam tournament of the season, which was a repeat of the match they played in the previous US Open. That was his first ever win in Flushing Meadows. He was then however defeated by Illya Marchenko in straight sets.

After reaching a semifinal in Alphen aan den Rijn, where Džumhur was forced to retire in the third set due to right shoulder injury, he helped his national team winning 5–0 in Vilnius a Davis Cup tie against Lithuania, notching a straight-set victory over Laurynas Grigelis, which gave Bosnia and Herzegovina a progress to the Europe/Africa Zone Group I for the very first time. Immediately after, Džumhur went on to play at the 2016 Moselle Open, losing to Guillermo García-López in the opening round, worsening their head-to-head record to 0–3. Then Džumhur headed to Morocco to play his last two clay-court challengers. Despite being No. 1 seed in both of them, he lost early to opponents ranked in the third and fourth hundred of ATP ranking, thus dropping out of Top 90 before entering the last phase of the season, a series of hardcourt indoor European tournaments.

Džumhur concluded his season in Paris, losing in the 2016 BNP Paribas Masters qualifying to Dustin Brown. It followed participations in events held in Moscow and Vienna. Firstly, at the 2016 Kremlin Cup he came back from 1–4 deficit in the third set versus Karen Khachanov to win 6–4 (despite the Russian was twice serving for the match) and progress to the second round where he was forced to retire against Pablo Carreño Busta due to food poisoning. Then Džumhur managed to reach the main draw of 2016 Erste Bank Open, recording there his first ever ATP World Tour 500 level match win, defeating Nicolás Almagro in the first round. He then wasted a 5–1 lead over Ivo Karlović in the final set, losing eventually in tiebreak. Nevertheless, after these tournaments Džumhur moved back into the top 80, where he finished season 2016. Yet again he did not fulfill his end-of-season ranking goal (set for Top 60 finish this time), however he maintained his career trend of closing every single season higher than the previous one.

2016 season was eventually ended on 77th position. On 15 December Džumhur was named by Nezavisne novine readers as Bosnian Athlete of the Year and was presented with the award at the ceremony in Sarajevo organized by the newspaper itself and Radio and Television of Bosnia and Herzegovina.

2017: Historic ATP World Tour titles & Top 30 finish
The new campaign for Džumhur was opened with a straight set defeat to Dudi Sela at the 2017 Aircel Chennai Open. His poor start to the season continued in Melbourne, where he lost in the first round of the 2017 Australian Open to Viktor Troicki, coming back from two sets down before eventually losing in five. Džumhur was criticized for his attitude on court, as he was involved in argument with chair umpire, which caused a point penalty being given to him. At 3:4 in the final set Džumhur requested supervisor to come on court, shortly before he lost his serve and allowed Troicki to serve for the match, which he did. The Bosnian refused to shake chair umpire's hand after the match.

Later he took part in the first ever Europe/Africa Zone Group I Davis Cup tie for Bosnia and Herzegovina, after the promotion sealed in Vilnius in the previous season, facing Poland in Zenica. Despite fitness problems, Džumhur managed to play and defeat in straight sets Hubert Hurkacz, contributing to a 5:0 win and progress to the second round to face Netherlands at home. Soon after he went on to play 2017 Garanti Koza Sofia Open, where he was beaten in his first match by Andreas Seppi, even though the Italian was involved in clay-court Davis Cup tie in Buenos Aires only two days earlier.

Džumhur notched his first ATP wins of the season in Memphis, where he defeated returning from injury Kevin Anderson, coming back from set and break down, and Steve Darcis in straight sets. In his fourth career ATP World Tour quarterfinal he fell to Ryan Harrison. Damir's rise of form continued in Delray Beach as he defeated Konstantin Kravchuk and barely lost to Juan Martín del Potro, receiving appraisal for his display from the Argentinian. Džumhur then went on to play in 2017 Dubai Tennis Championships, where he achieved his biggest career win to-date, by eliminating defending champion, World No.3 and current US Open title holder Stan Wawrinka winning 7–6, 6–3. In the second round he overcame Marcel Granollers, also in straight sets, reaching yet another quarterfinal, and his first on ATP World Tour 500 level. He was there defeated by Robin Haase in their third career meeting, worsening head-to-head record to 2–1. Thanks to points won in Dubai, Džumhur has broken into the top 70 for the first time, achieving singles ranking of 67 on 6 March.

Damir's first ever win in Indian Wells, over Ryan Harrison at world's second biggest outdoor tennis stadium in the opening round of a first of the season ATP Masters 1000 tournament gave him yet another career-high ranking improvement. Despite second round loss to Albert Ramos Viñolas, and withdrawal from 2017 Irving Tennis Classic Džumhur was ranked 66 on 20 March. His appearance in the next Masters event also ended in the second round, where he was eliminated by Nick Kyrgios, after saving five match points to win the opening confrontation with Hyeon Chung.

On 7–9 April Džumhur played for his Davis Cup team, fighting for a place in World Group play-offs. After overcoming Thiemo de Bakker in straight sets, in what was called by himself as the best match for Bosnia and Herzegovina he ever played, he has faced Robin Haase in 4th rubber, with Netherlands leading the tie by 2:1. Despite trailing by two sets to love and 0:4 in the third one Džumhur managed to level the match, only to lose eventually in five sets hence ending BiH team hopes of promotion. Damir's attitude was broadly commented as he was involved in multiple arguments throughout the match with chair umpire, ITF supervisor, Haase and other members of Dutch team.

In the months of April and May Džumhur was in poor form playing in various ATP clay-court tournaments across Europe. Firstly he failed to pass Monte-Carlo Masters qualifying, but managed to play in the main draw as a lucky loser, though lost yet again to Robin Haase. He was then twice eliminated in the second rounds of Budapest Open and Istanbul Open, before losing in the first matches in Rome Masters qualies, Nice and Roland Garros. At the end of the month he was ranked 96th and split with Serbian head coach Marko Subotić.

In June Džumhur went back to challenger circuit, playing on that level for the first time since October 2016. Even though he was a top seed in Lisbon, he was defeated in the opening round by 550th ranked Daniel Muñoz de la Nava. He then moved to Blois, France where again competed as highest ranked player. That time he managed to win all five matches and by defeating Calvin Hemery 6–1, 6–3 in the final he claimed his seventh ATP Challenger Tour singles title, moving up to 83rd place. It was followed by the only grass appearance of the season, at 2017 Wimbledon Championships, where Džumhur firstly notched his most convincing Grand Slam match triumph defeating Renzo Olivo 6–2, 6–0, 6–1, before falling to Aljaž Bedene in four-set second round battle.

Next he moved back to clay again, losing in the first rounds of Umag and Hamburg ATP events. August however saw him rising his form, winning 12 of 15 played matches across three tournaments. Firstly he reached his second ever ATP semifinal in Los Cabos, Mexico, losing to an eventual champion Sam Querrey in three sets. Then he was a runner-up in Santo Domingo challenger (lost to Víctor Estrella Burgos) before achieving his career-best result in Winston-Salem, North Carolina, where he defeated Denis Istomin, Gilles Simon, Horacio Zeballos, Hyeon Chung and Kyle Edmund en route to his first ATP final, also becoming Bosnia's first player to reach an ATP World Tour final, where he lost eventually to Roberto Bautista Agut. Immediately after Džumhur entered Top 60 for the first time, climbing up to 56th place. That was followed by an appearance at the last Grand Slam of the season, at 2017 US Open. Džumhur managed to overcome 27th seed Pablo Cuevas and Cedrik-Marcel Stebe to reach the Round of 32 for the third time in his career, and first in New York City. Despite defeat in four sets to Andrey Rublev, Damir moved up to career-high ranking of 55.

On 24 September, Džumhur defeated Fabio Fognini in the final of 2017 St. Petersburg Open, claiming his first ever ATP World Tour title, which sealed him 40th place on world singles ranking. His form continued in China, as he reached his fourth straight ATP World Tour 250 semifinal, in Shenzhen, defeating World No. 4 Alexander Zverev on the way, moving up to place no. 36. That was followed by first round exits in Beijing and Shanghai.

On 22 October, Džumhur defeated Ričardas Berankis in a three-set final to claim the 2017 Kremlin Cup, pushing him to a new high ranking of No. 31 the following day. He also made the doubles finals with Antonio Šančić but lost to Max Mirnyi and Philipp Oswald. He then reached Vienna ATP 500 2nd Round, defeating Berankis again, and losing to Tsonga despite having a match point; and withdrawn from Paris Masters, hence ending his most successful season to-date on yet again improved position number 30, which qualified him to be a Commitment Player for 2018 season and have a seeding at the Australian Open, first ever for him at any Grand Slam.

On 12 December, Džumhur was chosen as 2017 Bosnian Sportsman of the Year.

2018: Best season: Two Grand Slam third rounds, Third ATP title, Historic Top 25 debut
Džumhur started the year with a third round appearance at the 2018 Australian Open matching his best result at the tournament. He was defeated by world number 1 Rafael Nadal in straight sets.  At the 2018 French Open he also reached the third round which also matched his best result at the tournament. He was defeated by world number 3 Alexander Zverev in a close 5-set battle.

On 30 June, Džumhur defeated Adrian Mannarino in the final of 2018 Antalya Open, which brought him at a historic career high for his country of World No. 23 in the singles rankings on 2 July 2018.

Džumhur made the semifinals of the Los Cabo’s Open where he lost to world number 4 Juan Martín del Potro.

Džumhur ended the year with a third round appearance at the Paris Masters where he lost to world number 2 Novak Djokovic having lost the first set and having to retire early in the second set. 

2018 was also the only year that Džumhur participated in all nine masters 1000 events. His year-end ranking was World No. 47.

2019: Four ATP quarterfinals
Džumhur started off the year with a straight sets loss to world number 1 Novak Djokovic at the 2019 Doha Open.

Džumhur made four quarterfinal appearances in 2019 at the Rotterdam Open where he defeated 3rd seed Stefanos Tsitsipas in the first round but lost to eventual champion Gaël Monfils, Geneva Open where he defeated 5th seed Stan Wawrinka in the second round but lost to Radu Albot, Antalya Open where he went in as the 5th seed and defending champion but lost to Jordan Thompson, and the Zhuhai Championships where he went in as a qualifier but lost to Adrian Mannarino.

Džumhur only posted one grand slam win in 2019 at the US Open where he defeated Elliot Benchetrit in the first round but lost in the second round to world number 3 Roger Federer.

Džumhur ended the year with his first challenger final in 2 years at the Slovak Open. He lost to Dennis Novak in straight sets.

2020: Loss of form, out of top 100
Džumhur lost in the first round of the Australian Open to 15th seed Stan Wawrinka who would go on to make the quarterfinals. He dropped out of the top 100 on 17 February 2020 to No. 107.

In August, after not playing tennis for six months due to the COVID-19 pandemic, Džumhur returned to the court. He played world No. 1 Novak Djokovic in the first round of the US Open but lost in straight sets.

In October, Džumhur reached the Challenger final at the Sànchez-Casal Cup. He lost to Carlos Alcaraz in straight sets.

At the end of the year, Džumhur only posted 2 wins to 8 losses on the ATP tour and his ranking plummeted to No. 119 in the world.

2021: Continued struggles, out of top 150
Džumhur qualified for the Australian Open as a lucky loser but lost to James Duckworth in the first round.

At the Miami Masters, he qualified for the main draw also as a lucky loser and defeated Kevin Anderson in the first round before losing to 2nd seed and world No. 5 Stefanos Tsitsipas.

Džumhur made another challenger final at the Belgrade Challenger. He lost to the top seed Roberto Carballés Baena in straight sets.

In July, Džumhur made his first quarterfinal of the year at the Croatia Open where he lost to eventual finalist Richard Gasquet.

He dropped out of the top 130 at No. 136 on 27 September 2021, his lowest since April 2014. He further dropped out of the top 150 on 8 November 2021.

2022: Two Challenger finals and back to top 200
He qualified for the 2022 Australian Open main draw, but lost in the first round to Pablo Andujar. After the Australian tour, he reached the quarterfinals of Montpellier where he lost in straight sets to Filip Krajinovic, after beating 4th seed Nikoloz Basilashvili in the round of 16.

ATP career finals

Singles: 4 (3 titles, 1 runner-up)

Doubles: 1 (1 runner-up)

ATP Challenger and ITF Futures finals

Singles: 31 (19 titles, 12 runner-ups)

Doubles: 14 (8–6)

Exhibition tournaments

Davis Cup

   indicates the outcome of the Davis Cup match followed by the score, date, place of event, the zonal classification and its phase, and the court surface.

Performance timelines

Singles
Current through the 2022 Davis Cup.

Best Grand Slam results details

Record against other players

Record against top 10 players
Dzumhur's match record against players who were ranked world No. 10 or higher, with those who have been No. 1 in boldface:

  Kevin Anderson 2–0
  Nicolás Almagro 2–0
  Marcos Baghdatis 2–0
  Karen Khachanov 1–0
  Gilles Simon 1–0
  Janko Tipsarevic 1–0
  Fernando Verdasco 1–0
  Mikhail Youzhny 1–0
  Stefanos Tsitsipas 3–2
  Stan Wawrinka 2–2
  Alexander Zverev 1–1
  Rafael Nadal 1–2
  Tomáš Berdych 1–3
  Fabio Fognini 1–3
  Roberto Bautista Agut 0–1
  Pablo Carreno Busta 0–1
  Marin Čilić 0–1
  David Ferrer 0–1
  David Goffin 0–1
  Ernests Gulbis 0–1
  Jürgen Melzer 0–1
  Dominic Thiem 0–1
  Jo-Wilfried Tsonga 0–1
  Novak Djokovic 0–2
  Richard Gasquet 0–2
  Gaël Monfils 0–2
  Milos Raonic 0–2
  Juan Martín del Potro 0–3
  Roger Federer 0–3
  Grigor Dimitrov 0–5

* Statistics correct as of 23 July 2021.

Wins over top 10 players
He has a  record against players who were, at the time the match was played, ranked in the top 10.

Record vs. Top 100
Džumhur has 4–17 (21%) record against players ranked 1–10, 23–57 (29%) record against players ranked 11–50, and 58–47 (55%) record against players ranked 51–100, at the time when the match was played. It gives him a total record of 85 wins and 121 losses (41%) versus Top 100 players.

  Marcos Baghdatis 2–0
  Nicolás Almagro 2–0
  Kevin Anderson 1–0
  Roberto Bautista Agut 0–1
  Benjamin Becker 0–1
  Aljaž Bedene 0–1
  Thomaz Bellucci 0–1
  Ričardas Berankis 1–1
  Tomáš Berdych 1–2
  Dustin Brown 0–1
  Pablo Carreño Busta 0–1
  Marco Cecchinato 1–1
  Jérémy Chardy 0–1
  Hyeon Chung 2–0
  Marin Čilić 0–1
  Pablo Cuevas 1–0
  Taro Daniel 1–0
  Steve Darcis 2–0
  Juan Martín del Potro 0–1
  Grigor Dimitrov 0–2
  Ivan Dodig 1–0
  Alexandr Dolgopolov 0–1
  James Duckworth 0–1
  Kyle Edmund 2–0
 
  Thomas Fabbiano 2–0
  Roger Federer 0–2
  David Ferrer 0–1
  Fabio Fognini 1–2
  Teymuraz Gabashvili 1–0
 
  David Goffin 0–1 
  Andrey Golubev 0–1
  Marcel Granollers 2–1
  Robin Haase 2–3
 
  Jan Hájek 0–1
  Ryan Harrison 1–1
  Pierre-Hugues Herbert 0–1
  Denis Istomin 2–1
  Ivo Karlović 0–2
  Blaž Kavčič 0–1
  Karen Khachanov 1–0
  Nicolás Kicker 0–1
  Martin Kližan 0–1
  Philipp Kohlschreiber 0–1
  Konstantin Kravchuk 1–0
  Denis Kudla 1–0
  Mikhail Kukushkin 1–0
  Nick Kyrgios 0–1
  Lukáš Lacko 0–1
  Feliciano López 1–1 
  Paolo Lorenzi 1–0
  Adrian Mannarino 0–1
  Illya Marchenko 1–1
  Leonardo Mayer 1–0
  Daniel Muñoz de la Nava 1–0
  Jarkko Nieminen 0–1
  Renzo Olivo 1–0
  Adam Pavlásek 1–0
  Vasek Pospisil 0–1
  Sam Querrey 0–1
  Albert Ramos Viñolas 0–1
  Milos Raonic 0–2
  Pere Riba 1–0
  Lukáš Rosol 1–0
  Andrey Rublev 0–2
  Diego Schwartzman 0–1
  Dudi Sela 0–2
  Rafael Nadal 1–2
  Andreas Seppi 1–2
  Gilles Simon 1–0
  João Sousa 0–1
  Jan-Lennard Struff 1–1
  Dominic Thiem 0–1
  Bernard Tomic 1–1
  Jo-Wilfried Tsonga 0–1
  Viktor Troicki 0–1
  Jiří Veselý 2–0
  Stan Wawrinka 1–0
  Mikhail Youzhny 1–0
  Horacio Zeballos 1–0
  Alexander Zverev 1–0

Notes

References

External links

 
 
 

1992 births
Living people
Bosnia and Herzegovina male tennis players
Olympic tennis players of Bosnia and Herzegovina
Tennis players at the 2010 Summer Youth Olympics
Tennis players at the 2016 Summer Olympics
Sportspeople from Sarajevo